Gazi Ashraf Hossain (born 29 December 1960), also known as Lipu, is a former Bangladeshi cricketer who captained the Bangladesh national cricket team in its first seven One Day International (ODI) matches, two in the 1986 Asia Cup, three in the 1988 Asia Cup, and two in the 1990 Austral-Asia Cup.

ODI records
Lipu's highest ODI score (18) came in his very final ODI against Australia at Sharjah in 1990. He also has two ODI wickets in his bag. He dismissed Javed Miandad at Moratuwa in the Asia Cup in 1986.

ICC Trophy

He played in 20 ICC Trophy matches for Bangladesh in 1982, 1986, and 1990.  He was a member of the team captained by Shafiq-ul-Haq that lost its Semi Final against Zimbabwe and then also lost the Consolation Final against Papua New Guinea in the 1982 ICC Trophy in England. His best performance came in the opening match against West Africa. His 77 helped Bangladesh beat their opponents by 76 runs. Unfortunately, he was unable to keep up his good form, and at the end of the trophy he finished with 126 runs from 7 innings, with an average of 21.00.  He was the captain in the 1986 ICC Trophy also held in England, but the team failed to progress pass the group stage. Bangladesh defeated Kenya and Argentina, but lost against Zimbabwe (the eventual winners), Malaysia, East Africa and Denmark. Lipu's top score (41) came against Malaysia. He also took 6 wickets in the trophy at an average of 29.66. His best bowling was 3/26 against Kenya.

Ashraf Lipu was captain again in the ICC Trophy of 1990, in Netherlands. Though Lipu himself was out of form, (he scored only 106 runs in 7 innings, his highest, 40 coming in the first match against Kenya), the team performed admirably under his leadership to reach the semi-finals. Thus Lipu ended his international career on a high.

In other tournaments 
Gazi Ashraf enjoyed outstanding success in the 1984 South-East Asia Cup in Dhaka, in 1984.  His highest 62 came against Bangladesh Tigers. He also scored 40 against Hong Kong in the Final. It was during this tournament, that he cemented his place as the regular No 3 in the national side. In the tour to Kenya that followed, he did well in the 3-day and 2 Day match, but missed out in the One-Day matches.

As a captain
Among all the captains of Bangladesh, Lipu enjoyed the longest stint. He captained Bangladesh against Sri Lanka in March 1985, and remained as captain until the ICC Trophy in the summer of 1990.

Before taking up the captaincy of the national side, Lipu had already proved himself as a successful leader in domestic cricket. He was successful as captain of Abahani KC in the Dhaka League, and as the captain of Dhaka University in national cricket.  Also, in January 1985, he led the Bangladesh U-25 side against a touring New Zealand team.
According to many analysts, the era of Lipu's captaincy saw the most significant developments in Bangladesh cricket.  While the national team failed to achieve expected results, the period saw a number of talented cricketers like Minhajul Abedin, Athar Ali Khan, Akram Khan, Gholam Nousher, Aminul Islam and few others emerge as quality international players.  These players would be the stars of the Bangladesh side throughout the 90's and beyond. More importantly, during the second half of the 80's, professionalism entered Bangladesh cricket and at the same time cricket became increasingly popular among the young generation.

Even after retiring from international cricket Gazi Ashraf Lipu continued to be a successful captain in domestic arena. He led Abahani KC to the Dhaka league title in 1993–94. Faruk Ahmed, who was the captain of the national squad at that time was playing under him in League cricket.

 

|}

As a cricket administrator
In recent years, Lipu has successfully served different top level administrative positions in Bangladesh cricket. He is still heavily involved with the development of cricket in Bangladesh.

References

External links
 Gazi Ashraf at ESPNcricinfo
 Gazi Ashraf at CricketArchive

1960 births
Bangladesh One Day International cricketers
Bangladeshi cricket captains
Bangladeshi cricketers
20th-century Bangladeshi cricketers
Living people
Cricketers from Dhaka